Mahamadpur may refer to:
Mahamadpur, Bheri, Nepal
Mahamadpur, Narayani, Nepal